The 2000 Formula Nippon Championship was  contested over 10 rounds. 13 different teams, 21 different drivers, 2 different chassis and only 1 engine competed.

Teams and drivers

Calendar
All races were held in Japan.

Note:

Race 1 stopped due to rain and restarted, originally scheduled over 35 laps.

Race 8 stopped due to an accident and restarted, originally scheduled over 50 laps.

Championship standings

Drivers' Championship
Scoring system

Teams' Championship

External links
2000 Japanese Championship Formula Nippon

Formula Nippon
Super Formula
Nippon